Sir Robert (Robin) James Philipson  RSW (17 December 1916 – 26 May 1992) was an English painter who was influential within the Scottish art scene for over three decades.

Life
Philipson was born in 1916 in Broughton-in-Furness, Lancashire, the son of James Philipson. He was originally educated at Whitehaven Secondary School.

His family moved to Scotland when he was 14. He was then schooled at Dumfries Academy and then studied at Edinburgh College of Art from 1936 to 1940. On the outbreak of the Second World War he joined the King's Own Scottish Borderers and was posted to India, seeing action in Burma. After the war, he returned to Edinburgh and became a lecturer at the College of Art in 1947, later taking the post of Head of the Drawing and Painting Department from 1960 to 1982.

Philipson's early work was mainly of landscapes, still lifes and interiors. He was strongly influenced by Gillies and Maxwell, with whom, amongst others, he shared membership of the group known as The Edinburgh School. He is particularly renowned for his cockfight paintings, a series begun in the early 1950s. His later work in the 1960s explored more general figurative studies plus church and cathedral interiors and crucifixions.

Philipson's 1960 painting, Cathedral was inspired by a visit to Amiens Cathedral in northern France. He explores the subject in a manner reminiscent of Monet's earlier studies of Rouen Cathedral, creating a sense of grandeur by expressing the verticality of the gothic architecture and by showing the patterns of coloured light coming from the stained-glass windows.

Philipson was well known for his bold use of colour and his liberal use of heavy impasto in his works. He was appointed as President of the Royal Scottish Academy in 1973, a position he held until 1983.

Philipson received four honorary doctorates: DUniv (from both Stirling and Heriot Watt); LLD (from Aberdeen); and Dlitt (from Glasgow). In 1977 he was elected a Fellow of the Royal Society of Edinburgh. His proposers were John Cameron, Lord Cameron, Alick Buchanan-Smith, Anthony Elliot Ritchie, R. Martin and S. Smellie.

He also received many honours during his career, including a knighthood in 1976 for his services to art in Scotland.

He died in Edinburgh on 26 May 1992.

Family

He married three times: in 1949 to Brenda Mark (d.1960); in 1962 to Thora Clyne; and following divorce from Thora in 1975 married Diana Mary Pollock the following year.

Solo exhibitions

1973/76/83~The Scottish Gallery, Edinburgh
1973~Roland Browse & Delbanco, London
 1977~Retrospective Exhibition, McRobert Centre, Stirling University
 1976/78~Loomshop Gallery, Lower Largo
 1978~Browse & Darby Gallery, London
 1979~Haddington House Festival Exhibition, Stirling Gallery
 1980~Macaulay Gallery, Stenton
 1994~Retrospective Exhibition, Browse & Darby Gallery, London and to Billcliffe Fine Art, Glasgow
 1999~Retrospective Exhibition, Scottish National Gallery of Modern Art

Locations of Philipson's Works

Scottish National Gallery of Modern Art, Edinburgh
Scottish Arts Council
Royal Scottish Academy
Aberdeen; Liverpool; Walker; Manchester; Whitworth; Glasgow; Perth; Cardiff;
National Museum of Wales
London Contemporary Art Society
Fleming Wyfold Art Foundation, London
Laing Art Gallery, Newcastle
North Carolina Art Gallery and Museum
Hutton-in-the-Forest, Penrith, Cumbria.

References

External links
 
 Biography at the National Gallery of Scotland
 Profile on Royal Academy of Arts Collections

20th-century Scottish painters
Scottish male painters
Alumni of the Edinburgh College of Art
British Army personnel of World War II
1916 births
1992 deaths
People from Broughton-in-Furness
Knights Bachelor
Royal Scottish Academicians
People educated at Dumfries Academy
Royal Academicians
20th-century Scottish male artists